Great Night may refer to:

Great Night of Shiva, festival
"Great Night", song by William Beckett
"Great Night", song by Needtobreathe Hard Love
The Great Night, a 2011 novel by American author Chris Adrian
The Great Night (film), a 1922 American comedy film